Cordell Hull Barrow (15 April 1940 – 11 June 2003) was a Trinidad and Tobago sailor. He competed in the Flying Dutchman event at the 1964 Summer Olympics.

References

External links
 

1940 births
2003 deaths
Trinidad and Tobago male sailors (sport)
Olympic sailors of Trinidad and Tobago
Sailors at the 1964 Summer Olympics – Flying Dutchman
Place of birth missing